Black Forest is a 2013 Indian Malayalam-language film for children, directed by Joshy Mathew and produced by Baby Mathew Somatheeram. The film stars Manoj K. Jayan, Gouri Nair,Meera Nandan, Ashokan, Baiju, Krishnaprasad, Kalabhavan Shajon, Master Akash, Baby Parvathy, Dinesh Nair in lead roles.

References

External links
 black forest

2010s Malayalam-language films
Indian children's films